Sir Peter Halkett, 6th Baronet (1765–1839) was a Royal Navy officer.

Peter Halkett may also refer to:

For Peter Halkett, the boat designer, see Halkett boat
Sir Peter Halkett, 1st Baronet (c. 1660–1746), List of members of the 1st Parliament of Great Britain, of the Halkett baronets
Sir Peter Halkett, 2nd Baronet (1695–1755), of the Halkett baronets, MP for Stirling Burghs
Sir Peter Halkett, 3rd Baronet (died 1792), of the Halkett baronets
Sir Peter Arthur Halkett, 8th Baronet (1834–1904), of the Halkett baronets